Francis Raymond Shea was an American prelate of the Roman Catholic Church.  He served as the third bishop of the Diocese of Evansville in Indiana from 1969 to 1989.

Biography 
Francis Shea was born in Knoxville, Tennessee on December 4, 1913. He was ordained a priest for the Diocese of Nashville on March 19, 1939 in Rome by Bishop Ralph Hayes.  Shea served several assignments around Tennessee over the next three decades.  He was named a monsignor in 1967. 

On December 1, 1969, Shea was appointed bishop of the Diocese of Evansville by Pope Paul VI.  Shea was consecrated by Cardinal Luigi Raimondi on February 3, 1970. 

Pope John Paul II accepted Shea's resignation as bishop of Evansville on March 11, 1989.  Francis Shea died on August 18, 1994.

References

External links 
Roman Catholic Diocese of Evansville Home Page
Key dates in Bishop Shea's life

1913 births
1994 deaths
Roman Catholic bishops of Evansville
People from Knoxville, Tennessee
20th-century Roman Catholic bishops in the United States
Catholics from Tennessee